Center Stage is an American television anthology series that aired in 1954 on the American Broadcasting Company as a summer replacement for The Motorola Television Hour. It aired on the American Broadcasting Company (ABC) on alternate weeks from June 1, 1954 to September 21, 1954, swapping airings with the U.S. Steel Hour. The series was produced by Herbert Brodkin. There were nine episodes, one of which was written by Rod Serling. Among its stars were Walter Matthau, Charles Coburn, Lee Marvin, Barbara Nichols and Vivian Blaine.

References

External links
Center Stage at CVTA with a list of episodes

1954 American television series debuts
1954 American television series endings
1950s American anthology television series
American Broadcasting Company original programming